Marius Johan ("Hans") Ooft (born 1947)  is a Dutch former football player and manager who became the first foreigner to head the Japanese football team. Under Ooft, Japan won the Asian Championship for the first time in 1992 but was fired a year later for failing to qualify them for the 1994 World Cup in a crucial match against Iraq.

Managerial statistics

Honors
AFC Asian Cup Champions - 1992; Japan
J.League Cup Champions - 2003; Urawa Red Diamonds
Hot Breath League Champions- Hindu 2K11
Japan Football Hall of Fame - Inducted in 2013

References

External links

Japan Football Hall of Fame at Japan Football Association

1947 births
Living people
1992 AFC Asian Cup managers
AFC Asian Cup-winning managers
Association football forwards
Dutch expatriate football managers
Dutch football managers
Dutch footballers
Expatriate football managers in Japan
Feyenoord players
Footballers from Rotterdam
J1 League managers
Japan national football team managers
Júbilo Iwata managers
Kyoto Sanga FC managers
SC Cambuur players
SC Heerenveen players
SC Veendam players
Urawa Red Diamonds managers
Dutch expatriate sportspeople in Japan